Sultan Khalfan Al-Alawi (born March 16, 1977 in Qatar) is a Qatari former professional tennis player. A top junior player in Qatar, runner-up of the International Junior Championships in 1994 and 1995, Khalfan was the most successful member of the Qatar Davis Cup team, playing 59 ties between 1993 and 2009 and compiling a 29–26 record in singles, 19–22 in doubles. He appeared nine times in the Qatar Open draw between 1996 and 2007, losing each time in the first round. Khalfan reached a career-high singles ranking of No. 950 in late 2000.

References

External links
 
 
 

1977 births
Living people
Qatari male tennis players
Tennis players at the 1998 Asian Games
Tennis players at the 2002 Asian Games
Tennis players at the 2006 Asian Games
Asian Games competitors for Qatar